Events in the year 1788 in Norway.

Incumbents
Monarch: Christian VII

Events
21 August – Theater War: The Swedish attack on Russia caused Denmark-Norway to declare war on Sweden in accordance with its treaty obligations to Russia.
24 September - 8,000-10,000 men under the command of Prince Charles of Hesse attacked Bohuslen from Norway.
29 September - Battle of Kvistrum.

Arts and literature

Births
24 February - Johan Christian Dahl, painter (d.1857)
20 July - Paul Hansen Birch, military officer (d.1863)
5 October - Broder Knudtzon, merchant and politician (d.1864)
14 December - Jacob Kielland, businessperson, consul and politician (d.1863)

Full date unknown
Asle Christensen Hoffart, politician
Catharine Hermine Kølle, adventurer and painter (d.1859)
Sølver Hansen Laane, politician
Lars Thorstensen Tønsager, politician

Deaths

See also